Panalipa is a genus of moths of the family Crambidae.

Species
Panalipa bisignatus (Swinhoe, 1886)
Panalipa immeritalis (Walker, 1859)

References

Natural History Museum Lepidoptera genus database

Schoenobiinae
Crambidae genera
Taxa named by Frederic Moore